Ever since its foundation, Tractor has had 30 managers, which 4 were interim and 6 held the job on more than one time. The first one was Mohammad Bayati and the current manager is Faraz Kamalvand.

Managerial history
Below is a list of Tractor coaches from 1970 until the present day.

Table headers
 Nationality – The coach's nationality is given as his country of birth.
 From – The date the coach began working for Tractor.
 To – The date the coach last worked for Tractor.
 Honours – The trophies won while coaching Tractor.

Notes

References

Managers
Tractor